Laurent Edward Chabot (October 5, 1900 – October 10, 1946) was a Canadian professional ice hockey player. Chabot played in the National Hockey League from 1926 to 1937. He was a member of two Stanley Cup championship teams, the New York Rangers in 1928, and the Toronto Maple Leafs in 1932. Chabot played for the New York Rangers, Toronto Maple Leafs, Montreal Canadiens, Chicago Black Hawks, Montreal Maroons, and New York Americans. Chabot won the Vezina Trophy in 1934–35 for allowing the fewest goals against.

Playing career
During his stint with the Rangers, he was billed as "Lorne Chabotsky" by Rangers' publicity men Bruno and Blythe, in an attempt to garner more Jewish fans. Chabot was unhappy with the arrangement and the publicity men were soon replaced by Jack Filman. Chabot was also the goalie who was injured during the 1928 playoffs, forcing coach Lester Patrick into the goal for the remainder of the game.

Chabot played in the two longest games in NHL history, losing the longest in 1935–36 as a member of the Montreal Maroons and winning the second longest in 1932–33 as a member of the Toronto Maple Leafs. Both games went into the sixth overtime; both final scores were 1–0. He was the first hockey player to appear on the cover of Time Magazine. It was the February 11, 1935 issue, the lone season when Chabot was playing with the Chicago Black Hawks.

Years after his retirement, he suffered from severe arthritis and was bedridden. He developed Bright's Disease and after a long bout with it, he died, five days after his 46th birthday. He was buried in the Notre Dame des Neiges Cemetery in Montreal.

Legacy

In 1998, he was ranked number 84 on a list of the 100 greatest hockey players compiled by The Hockey News. He was the only player on the list then eligible for the Hockey Hall of Fame who has not been elected to it.

The 2009 book 100 Ranger Greats ranked Chabot 95th all-time of the 901 New York Rangers who had played during the team's first 82 seasons.

In two separate editions of The Hockey News "The Top 100 Players of All-Time" (2010 and 2018) Lorne Chabot was rated as the 20th best goaltender, the only eligible one on the list not inducted into the Hockey Hall of Fame.

Career statistics

Regular season and playoffs

Awards and achievements
 Allan Cup (1925, 1926).
 Stanley Cup Championship (1928, 1932).
 Vezina Trophy (1935).
 NHL First All-Star Team (1935).

References
 
Notes

External links

1900 births
1946 deaths
Burials at Notre Dame des Neiges Cemetery
Canadian ice hockey goaltenders
Chicago Blackhawks players
Deaths from nephritis
Ice hockey people from Montreal
Montreal Canadiens players
Montreal Maroons players
New York Americans players
New York Rangers players
Stanley Cup champions
Toronto Maple Leafs players
Vezina Trophy winners